Dream Again is American singer-songwriter Lili Añel's third studio recording. Released in 2007, this marks the first time Lili is credited as co-producer along with Cooke Harvey. The CD received a favorable review in JazzTimes, catching the attention of ESC Records out of Germany. Seven of the tracks were compiled, along with eight tracks from her 2001 album Hi-Octane Coffee, and pressed onto a new album entitled Life or Death. It was released throughout Europe and Japan. This resulted in her first international album on a European record label .

Track listing
"Try Again" – 3:17
"Over You" – 3:47
"Between Me" – 4:58 
"Dream Again" – 5:53
"Down To Zero" – 3:57
"I'm Sorry" – 3:30
"Temporary Amnesia" – 2:50 
"If" – 5:13
"I Pretend" – 3:21 
"Nothing In Common" – 3:30 
"It's You Again" – 2:44 
"If God Had A Wallet" – 3:48
"Life Or Death" – 4:24
"Land On My Feet" – 3:48

All compositions by Lili Añel except "Down to Zero" by Joan Armatrading.

Personnel
Musicians
Lili Anel – vocals, guitars
Cooke Harvey – electric & upright bass, keyboards
Dave Bozenhard – guitars
John DiGiovanni – drums, percussion
 String arrangements and textures by Cook Harvey

Engineers
Cooke Harvey 
Mastered by Marc Moss at Target Studios – Newark, DE

References

2007 albums
Lili Añel albums